Baburao Patel (1904–1982) was an Indian publisher and writer, associated with films and politics.

Career
He was the editor and publisher of India's first film trade magazine, Filmindia, the first edition of which was published in 1935.

Baburao was also the founder and editor of a political magazine, Mother India (different from the magazine of the same name started by the Aurobindo group).

He was elected to the Lok Sabha as the Jana Sangh candidate from Shajapur, Madhya Pradesh in 1967.

Personal life
Baburao Patel was born Baba Patil to politician Pandurang Patil (Pandoba Patil) near Mumbai, but changed his name to Baburao Patel because he mostly dealt with Gujarati community in professional life.

He was married three times. His third wife was singer and actor Sushila Rani Patel (nee Tombat), originally from Chennai. He directed her in a couple of films in the 1940s.

Books
 The Rosary and the Lamp (1966), Girnar Publications
 Burning Words: A Critical History of Nine Years of Nehru's Rule from 1947 to 1956 (1956), Sumati Publications
 Grey Dust (1949), Sumati Publications
 A Blueprint of Our Defence (1962), Sumati Publications

Filmography
As director & scriptwriter 
Kismet(1929)
Sati Mahananda (सती महानन्दा) (1933)
Chand ka Tukda (1933-'35)
Bala Joban (1934)
Maharani  (1934)
Pardesi Saiyan (1935)
Draupadi  (1944)
Gwalan (1946)

External links
Organizer.org Centenary profile
Movie Talkies listing
Time magazine article profiling Filmindia question answer page by Baburao Patel
Screen India Profile

References 

1904 births
1982 deaths
Lok Sabha members from Madhya Pradesh
20th-century Indian film directors
Indian male journalists
Film producers from Madhya Pradesh
Bharatiya Jana Sangh politicians
Journalists from Madhya Pradesh
Film directors from Madhya Pradesh
India MPs 1967–1970